Emmanuelle Mörch (born 4 July 1990) is a French wheelchair tennis player who was a quarterfinalist at the 2021 French Open and competed at the 2016 Summer Paralympics.

Mörch became a paraplegic after a snowboarding accident in 2008.

References

External links
 
 
 

1990 births
Living people
People from Les Ulis
Tennis players from Paris
French female tennis players
Paralympic wheelchair tennis players of France
Wheelchair tennis players at the 2016 Summer Paralympics
21st-century French women